Alfred Settle (17 September 1912 – January 1988) was a professional footballer who played for Sheffield United  and Lincoln City as a left-half between 1936 and 1946.

Born in Barugh Green, Yorkshire, he started his career at his local club, Barugh Green Rovers. In 1936, Sheffield United paid Barugh Green Rovers  a transfer fee £10 for Settle. He was transferred to Lincoln City in 1946, where an ankle injury ended his professional football career.

References

External links
Lincoln City profile

Footballers from Barnsley
1912 births
1988 deaths
English footballers
Association football midfielders
Sheffield United F.C. players
Lincoln City F.C. players